Beardstown is an unincorporated community in Franklin Township, Pulaski County, in the U.S. state of Indiana.

History
Beardstown was founded in 1901, and took its name from Beardstown, Illinois. A post office was established at Beardstown in 1903, and remained in operation until it was discontinued in 1905.

Geography

References

Unincorporated communities in Pulaski County, Indiana
Unincorporated communities in Indiana